The Taipei Metro Gangqian station is located in the Neihu District in Taipei, Taiwan. It is a station on Wenhu line.

Station overview

This three-level, elevated station features two side platforms, two exits, and platform elevators located on the north and south sides of the concourse level.

Public art for the station is situated on the wall above the escalators. The piece, titled "The Paradise of Neihu", is a large-scale mixed media artwork consisting of needlepoint created with the help of 83 artists and volunteers.

History
22 February 2009: Gangqian station construction is completed.
4 July 2009: Begins service with the opening of Brown Line.

Station layout

Gallery

Nearby Places
 Guanshan Riverside Park
 Neihu Technology Park
 Taipei Municipal Nei-Hu Vocational High School
 Neihu Community College
 Taipei Flower Market
 Lishan Elementary School
 Lishan Junior High School
 Lishan High School
 Neihu Sports Center

References

Wenhu line stations
Railway stations opened in 2009